This is a list of raised and transitional bogs of Switzerland. It is based on the Federal Inventory of Raised and Transitional Bogs of National Importance. The inventory is part of a 1991 Ordinance of the Swiss Federal Council implementing the Federal Law on the Protection of Nature and Cultural Heritage.

Inventory of raised and transitional bogs of national importance

See also 
 Nature parks in Switzerland

References

External links
Interactive map
Hochmoore/Hauts-marais/Torbiere alte  with descriptions of all sites.
Biotopbeurteilung/Evaluation des biotopes 
Switzerland - Raised and Transitional Bogs of National Importance (CH02), Common Database on Designated Areas (CDDA)

Switzerland geography-related lists
Switzerland nature-related lists
Protected areas of Switzerland